The DRDO Rustom (English: Warrior) is a medium-altitude long-endurance unmanned air vehicle (UAV) being developed by Defence Research and Development Organisation for the three services, Indian Army, Indian Navy and the Indian Air Force of the Indian Armed Forces. Rustom is derived from the NAL's LCRA (Light Canard Research Aircraft) developed by a team under the leadership of late Prof Rustom Damania in the 1980s. The UAV will have structural changes and a new engine.

The Rustom will replace/supplement the Heron UAVs in service with the Indian armed forces.

Design and development
Rustom-1's basic design is derived from the NAL light canard research aircraft (LCRA). The aircraft has been named after Rustom Damania, a former professor of IISc, Bangalore who died in 2001. DRDO decided to name the UAV after him because it is derived from National Aerospace Laboratories' light canard research aircraft (LCRA) developed under Rustom Damania's leadership in the 1980s.

With the Rustom MALE UAV project, DRDO intends to move away from traditional ways of developing products whereby laboratories under DRDO, like the Aeronautical Development Establishment (ADE), which is involved in this project, develop and finalize the product and transfer technology to a production agency.

DRDO will follow a practice of concurrent engineering where initial design efforts also take into consideration production issues, with the production agency participating in the development of the system right from the design stage. The agency will also follow up issues related to infrastructure and expertise for the product and its support, thereby overcoming time delays in crucial projects.

Rustom-H, built on a different design, is a Medium-Altitude Long-Endurance (MALE) Unmanned Aerial Vehicle (MALE UAV), a twin engine system designed to carry out surveillance and reconnaissance missions.

The range of advanced technologies and systems include the following:

  Aerodynamic configurations, High aspect ratio wing, Composite airframe integrated with propulsion system, De-icing system for wings
  Highly reliable systems with built-in redundancy for flight critical systems like flight control and navigation, data links, power management, - and mission critical payload management system
  Digital Flight Control and Navigation System, Automatic Take off and Landing (ATOL)
  Digital communication technologies for realizing data links to control and operate the mission and relay UAVs
  Payloads with high resolution and precision stabilized platforms.

Variants
There will be three variants of the Rustom UAV.

 Rustom-1: Tactical UAV with endurance of 12 hours (based on NAL's LCRA )
 Rustom-H: Larger UAV with flight endurance of over 24 hours (completely different design from Rustom-1), higher range and service ceiling than Rustom-1.
 TAPAS-BH-201 (Rustom-2): An unmanned aerial vehicle based on Rustom-H model. TAPAS-BH-201 was commonly believed to be an Unmanned Combat Aerial Vehicle(UCAV) but at the press conference  S Christopher, Director General of DRDO stated  "Media reports are incorrect. Tapas is an UAV and not an  UCAV".

Current status

The Indian government has allowed the development of the Rustom MALE UAV project in association with a production agency cum development partner (PADP). The ADE officials indicated that the requests for proposals (RFP) would shortly be issued to four vendors which are the Tata Power Strategic Engineering Division, Larsen & Toubro Limited, Godrej Aerospace Limited and Hindustan Aeronautics Limited-Bharat Electronics Limited (joint bid) who were chosen out of the 23 firms that responded.

Currently, negotiations are underway between these companies and the three Indian armed forces since the private majors are looking for support and commitment from them before they start executing any development and production plans. This is because the chosen PADP will also have a financial stake in the Rustom project. The Armed Forces would also be asked to take up a financial stake and the Indian government may have to guarantee that a specific number of Rustom UAVs will be bought.
On 09 Nov 21 the project achieved the rare distinction of indigenously developing Automatic Take off and Landing (ATOL) using GAGAN SBAS. On 09 Mar 22 the programme achieved a double digit Endurance clocking 10:20hr surpassing the previous time of 08:05hr which was achieved in 2020.

Rustom-1
The first flight of Rustom-I UAV took place on 16 November 2009 at the Taneja Aerospace Air Field near Hosur. The demonstration resulted in the prototype crashing to the ground. Stated by the DRDO, the taxiing and takeoff was exactly as planned. Due to misjudgment of altitude of the flight, the on-board engine was switched off through ground command which made the on-board thrust developed to go to zero.

Despite the mishap, the state-owned Defence Research and Development Organisation stated: "The flight proved the functioning of a number of systems such as aerodynamics, redundant flight control, engine and datalink, which go a long way towards the development of a complex UAV."

The second "maiden" flight took place on 15 Oct 2010. The test was conducted in Hosur. The Indian army was impressed with Rustom-1 and will use it as a MALE UAV.

Rustom-1 made its 5th successful flight on morning of 12 November 2011, flying for 25 minutes at  AGL at a speed . It completed its 8th successful flight on 8 Dec 2011. The highlight of the flight was that Rustom-1 was test flown with the 'gimbal payload assembly carrying daylight TV & Infra-Red camera for the first time. Good quality pictures were received from the camera in gimbal payload assembly.

TAPAS-BH-201

DRDO carried out a successful test flight of TAPAS-BH-201 on 25 February 2018, at the Aeronautical Test Range (ATR) located in Chalakere, Chitradurga district. This was the first flight of the UAV in user configuration with higher power engine.

During its development trials Rustom 2 crashed near Jodichikkenahalli in Karnataka's Chitradurga district on 17 September 2019. No one was hurt. The UAV was being tested at Challakere Aeronautical Test Range, a DRDO outdoor testing facility. TAPAS-BH-201 completed satellite communication (SATCOM) mode trial and flew with long range electro-optical payload as of 16 August 2020.

In December 2021, Rustom- II had reached an altitude of 25,000 feet and had achieved an endurance of 10 hours. On March 12, 2022, it demonstrated its flight altitude above 27,500 feet with an endurance of 18 hours.

Specifications
Specifications of Rustom-1 and Rustom-H are as follows:

See also

References

External links
Medium Altitude Long Endurance UAV-Rustom
The first flight of Rustom-1 MALE UAV's second prototype

Unmanned military aircraft of India
Military equipment of India
DRDO aircraft
Proposed aircraft of India
Medium-altitude long-endurance unmanned aerial vehicles

it:BAE Mantis